Neal H Pogue is an American producer, audio engineer and mixer originally from Roselle, New Jersey, and based in Los Angeles. Pogue is a multi-time Grammy Award winner, having first won for his engineering and mixing work on Outkast's Speakerboxxx/The Love Below (2004) – which won the Album of the Year category, and his audio mixing work on Tyler, The Creator's Igor & Call Me If You Get Lost – which both records won the Best Rap Album category respectively in 2020 & 2022. Pogue has also produced for artists such as M.I.A, Nelly Furtado, Earth, Wind & Fire and has mixed for artists such as TLC, Pink, Nicki Minaj, Janelle Monáe, Tyler, the Creator, and Steve Lacy. Having engineered and mixed TLC's Grammy nominated 11-time platinum single "Waterfalls", Pogue also arranged the horns on "Waterfalls" under the pseudonym "Shock". Pogue has gone on to work with many prominent names in music.

Life and career
Pogue was born on December 27, 1963, in Roselle, New Jersey, the son of social worker Joan Ford and artist Arthur Pogue. At a young age, his interest in music started with the drums, when his mom gave him his first drum set. In 1984, he took his dreams of becoming a tour drummer to Los Angeles, California . After numerous attempts of breaking into the industry as a musician, Pogue enrolled at Sound Master Recording, a local school for audio engineering. 
By experimenting with instruments by recording them on a four-track recorder, he began to appreciate the craft of engineering. After school through a mutual friend, Pogue interned at a studio owned by Michael Jackson's younger brother Randy Jackson. He was then awarded with the opportunity to be an assistant engineer on Jackson's Randy & The Gypsys album. Pogue assisted there for a year. During Pogue's internship, he met Larrabee Sound Studios owner Kevin Mills and interned under him for 1 year due to Mills' encouragement that Pogue should go out on his own. In 1990, while doing various recording and mixing gigs in LA, he came in contact with Bobby Brown through Louil Silas Jr., who was an MCA Records Executive A&R at the time. Brown, who was living in Atlanta at the time, suggested that Pogue work there with him on his self-titled album. While working in Atlanta, Pogue fell in love with the city and decided to move him and his family there in 1992. While in Atlanta, through recording artist Pebbles, Pogue met the newly formed production company Organized Noize whom at the time had the LaFace Records bound unsigned hip hop duo Outkast. Through his relationship with LaFace he came in contact and worked with Toni Braxton, Goodie Mob, TLC, and Outkast, who he would go on to engineer multiple successful albums for. Pogue went on to start his own production company, Fulton Yard Unlimited, with partner Walter McKennie, with whom he has worked with M.I.A., Nelly Furtado, En Vogue, and Earth Wind & Fire.

Pogue currently resides in Los Angeles where he has continued a prolific mixing career including working on albums for R&B/hip hop duo THEY., Swedish artist Robyn's #1 charted album Honey, "Tonya" for Brockhampton's Iridescence, and Macy Gray for whom he mixed her album Ruby.

Career highlights

Working with Outkast
In 1993, Pogue began working on Outkast's initial effort Southernplayalisticadillacmuzik. After Outkast's initial effort released in 1994, Pogue mixed two songs from TLC's 1995 album Crazy Sexy Cool, one being the smash hit "Waterfalls" which followed by Pogue mixing the hit single "Elevators" on Outkast's second studio album ATLiens in 1996, then mixing Aquemini in 1998. In 2000, Pogue mixed hit singles "Ms. Jackson" and "B.O.B" from the album Stankonia. In 2002, Andre 3000 came to Pogue with new music for what was soon to be Outkast's Grammy Award-winning album Speakerboxxx/The Love Below, Andre played Pogue a demo version of "Hey Ya". Pogue convinced Andre 3000 to choose "Hey Ya" as Speakerboxxx/The Love Below's lead single. The genre-bending song went on to become one of the most iconic songs of the 2000s appearing on multiple charts including Billboard's Adult Top 40, US Alternative Songs Chart, and Hot 100 where it sat at #1 for nine weeks. While working in collaboration with Outkast, Pogue mixed tracks such as "She Lives in My Lap", "She's Alive", "Prototype", "Take Off Your Cool" featuring Grammy Award-winner Norah Jones, "Spread" and "Vibrate".

Working with Earth, Wind & Fire
In 2012, Pogue worked on the production, mixing, instrumentation and composing of Earth, Wind & Fire's 20th studio album Now, Then & Forever that was released on September 13, 2013. Pogue co-wrote on the song "Sign On". Pogue sent a track to Academy Award-nominated and Grammy-winning songwriter Siedah Garrett, which would become the lead single "My Promise". Pogue recorded the demo with Garrett, then sent it to Earth, Wind & Fire. The album charted as number 11 on the US Billboard 200, and charted as number 6 on the US Top R&B/Hip-Hop Albums.

Discography

1990s

1994: Outkast - Southernplayalisticadillacmuzik
1994: TLC - CrazySexyCool
1995: Goodie Mob - Soul Food
1995: Society Of Soul - Brainchild
1996: Outkast - ATLiens
1996: Tony Rich Project - Words
1997: Soul Food (Soundtrack)
1998: Outkast - Aquemini
1998: Goodie Mob - Still Standing
1999: Goodie Mob - World Party

2000s

2000: Ying Yang Twins - Thug Walkin'
2000: Pink - Can't Take Me Home
2000: Lucy Pearl - Lucy Pearl
2000: Outkast - Stankonia
2001: The Fast and the Furious: Original Motion Picture Soundtrack
2001: Yolanda Adams - Believe
2001: The Isley Brothers - Eternal
2002: Talib Kweli - Quality
2002: Citizen Cope – Citizen Cope
2003: Brian McKnight - U-Turn
2003: Queen Latifah - Persona
2003: Outkast - Speakerboxxx/The Love Below
2005: Transplants – Haunted Cities
2005: Stevie Wonder – A Time to Love (album)
2005: Earth, Wind & Fire – Illumination
2006: Donavon Frankenreiter – Move by Yourself
2006: Nelly Furtado – Loose
2006: Outkast - Idlewild
2007: Talib Kweli - Eardrum
2007: Pharoahe Monch - Desire
2008: Kerli - Love Is Dead
2008: Busta Rhymes - Back on My B.S.
2008: Sean Garrett - Turbo 919
2008: Metronomy - Nights Out
2008: Solange - Sol-Angel and the Hadley Street Dreams
2008: Robin Thicke - Something Else
2008: Snoop Dogg - Ego Trippin'
2008: Gym Class Heroes - The Quilt
2008: The Game - LAX
2008: N.E.R.D. – Seeing Sounds
2008: Common – Universal Mind Control
2009: Franz Ferdinand – Tonight: Franz Ferdinand 
2009: La Roux - La Roux 
2009: Young Money – We Are Young Money

2010s

2010: Bowwow ft. Chris Brown - Ain't Thinkin' 'Bout You
2010: Nicki Minaj - Pink Friday 
2010: Lil Wayne - Rebirth
2011: Demi Lovato – Unbroken 
2011: Lil Wayne - Tha Carter IV 
2011: Awolnation - "Sail"
2012: T. Mills – Leaving Home 
2013: Earth, Wind & Fire – "Guilding Lights"
2013: Zendaya - Zendaya
2013: LL Cool J - "Whaddup"
2013: Aloe Blacc - Wake Me Up 
2013: Aloe Blacc - Lift Your Spirit 
2013: Earth, Wind & Fire - Now, Then & Forever
2013: Janelle Monáe - The Electric Lady
2014: Aretha Franklin - Aretha Franklin Sings the Great Diva Classics
2015: Tribe Called Quest - People's Instinctive Travels and the Paths of Rhythm
2015: Janelle Monae - Wondaland Presents: The Eephus
2015: Joywave - How Do You Feel Now
2016: Big Baby DRAM - DRAM
2016: King - We Are King
2016: Duckwrth - I'm Uugly
2016: Metronomy - Summer 08
2017: Busta Rhymes - "Blessed"
2017: Duckwrth - An Xtra Uugly Mixtape
2017: Tyler the Creator - Flower Boy
2017: THEY. - Nu Religion Hyena
2017: ZZ Ward - The Storm
2017: Busty and the Bass - Uncommon Good
2018: Buddy (rapper) - Harlan and Alondra
2018: Brockhampton (band) - Iridescence
2018: Duckwrth - "Soprano"
2018: Leikeli47 - Acrylic|"Roll Call2018: Tyler the Creator - Grinch Holiday EP2018: Robyn - Honey2018: Donna Missal - This Time2018: Max Frost - "Good Morning"
2018: Macy Gray - Ruby2018: Anderson .Paak - Bubblin2018: Doja Cat - Amala (album)2018: SAINt JHN - Collection One2018: Dr. Seuss' The Grinch Soundtrack2018: THEY. - Fireside(EP)2019: Duckwrth - Falling Man2019: Bubba - Kaytranada2019: Scarypoolpary - Exit Form2019: The Wreck Shit Club - "Beeper (single)"
2019: Tyler the Creator - Igor (album)2019: Doja Cat - Hot Pink (album)2019: Kemba (rapper) - Gilda (album)2019: IDK - Is He Real?2019: Cherokee (musician) - Just a Brooklyn Girl (EP)2020s

2020: Ryan Beatty - Dreaming of David2020: L'Impératrice - "Fou"
2020: Haim - Women in Music Pt. III2020: Busty and the Bass - Eddie (Album)2020: Duckwrth - Supergood2020: Pharrell Williams feat. Jay-Z - Entrepreneur (single) 
2021: Bonzie - Reincarnation 
2021: Kara Marni - Trippin (Tripped Out Soul Mix)2021: Awolnation - Megalithic Symphony (10th Anniversary Deluxe Edition)2021: L'Impératrice - Tako Tsubo2021: Umi- Introspection Reimagined2021: Baby Jake - "Do I Fit In Your Shoes?"
2021: Octavio - "Someday I'll Be Happy
2021: The Marias - Cinema
2021: Michaela Jaé Rodriguez - "Something to Say (single)"
2021: Doja Cat - Planet Her
2021: Tyler the Creator - Call Me If You Get Lost
2021: The Undefeated - Liberated Music for the Movement Vol. 3
2021: Spacejam New Legacy (Soundtrack)
2021: Baby Jake - The Sun Wakes Up Earlier Now
2021: BlackStarKids - Puppies Forever
2022: Leikeli47 - Shape Up
2022: Steve Lacy - Gemini Rights

Grammy Awards

References

https://www.grammy.com/grammys/artists/neal-h-pogue
https://sonicscoop.com/2017/09/18/neal-h-pogue-instinctual-mixing-tyler-creator/
http://www.studioexpresso.com/profiles/nealpogue.htm
http://musicbrainz.org/release/c1daac98-531b-4290-8c74-76c2c9a2ef42
http://clatl.com/atlanta/the-making-of-outkasts-aquemini/Content?oid=1552576
https://www.resolutionmag.com/wp-content/uploads/2016/02/Neal-Pogue.pdf
https://www.okayplayer.com/music/making-of-outkast-speakerboxxx-the-love-below.html
http://www.discogs.com/Norah-Jones-Featuring/release/2560846
http://www.huffingtonpost.com/2013/08/19/earth-wind-fire-now-then-forever-verdine-white-talks-new-album-premieres-new-track_n_3777855.html
http://www.prosoundnetwork.com/article/pogue-mixes-ewf-with-aga/16849
http://www.prweb.com/releases/2013/10/prweb11215558.htm
http://www.prnewswire.com/news-releases/earth-wind--fires-new-studio-album-now-then--forever-debuts-at-11-on-billboard-200-and-5-on-the-top-rb-charts-224249511.html
https://sonicscoop.com/neal-h-pogue-instinctual-mixing-tyler-creator/

External Links
Neal Pogue Interview NAMM Oral History Library (2021)

American music industry executives
Grammy Award winners
Living people
Musicians from Atlanta
Musicians from New Jersey
Year of birth missing (living people)